Henderson–Oxford Airport  is a public use airport located four nautical miles (5 mi, 7 km) northeast of the central business district of Oxford, a city in Granville County, North Carolina, United States. It is owned by the Oxford-Henderson Airport Authority. This airport is included in the National Plan of Integrated Airport Systems for 2011–2015, which categorized it as a general aviation facility.

 The airport's ICAO identifier is KHNZ.

Facilities and aircraft 
Henderson–Oxford Airport covers an area of 220 acres (89 ha) at an elevation of 526 feet (160 m) above mean sea level. It has one runway designated 6/24 with an asphalt surface measuring 5,002 by 97 feet (1,525 x 30 m).

For the 12-month period ending August 26, 2011, the airport had 25,320 aircraft operations, an average of 69 per day: 95% general aviation, 5% military, and <1% air taxi, At that time there were 41 aircraft based at this airport: 95% single-engine and 5% multi-engine.

References

External links 
  at North Carolina DOT airport guide
 Aerial image as of March 1998 from USGS The National Map
 

Airports in North Carolina
Transportation in Granville County, North Carolina
Buildings and structures in Granville County, North Carolina